Charles Walder Grinstead (1 December 1860 – 16 March 1930) was an English champion tennis player. He reached the quarter finals at Wimbledon 1883. Grinstead reached the Wimbledon All Comers Final in 1884, where he beat Ernest Renshaw before losing to Herbert Lawford. Together with C. E. Weldon, Grinstead won the Oxford Men's Doubles in 1883. In 1884, the Oxford Men's Doubles event and its trophy were handed over to the All England Club to be known as the All England Men's Doubles as part of the Wimbledon Championships; consequently winners of the Oxford events are included as Wimbledon champions.

Early life
Charles Walder Grinstead was born on 1 December 1860 in Teignmouth, Devon, England, the son of Charles Grinstead (a Church of England cleric) and his wife Sarah A. (née Stanley). He was educated at the University of Oxford, matriculating in 1879 as a member of Keble College and graduating in 1874 as a member of Charsley's Hall.

Grand Slam finals

Singles (1 runner-up)

Career singles titles and finals

Titles won (14)

Runner up (8)

Later life

Having completed his B.A. at Oxford, Grinstead was intended to become a Church of England cleric like his father. While Grinstead had enjoyed his academic studies and his sport at university, he did not wish to become a cleric. Instead in the spring of 1885, he immigrated to Ontario, Canada where he spent nine months, and then relocated to the United States of America.

Charles Walder Grinstead died in Nikenbah, Hervey Bay, Queensland, Australia on 16 March 1930.  He was buried in Polson Cemetery, Hervey Bay, Queensland.

References

1860 births
1930 deaths
19th-century English people
19th-century male tennis players
Alumni of Keble College, Oxford
Alumni of Charsley's Hall, Oxford
English male tennis players
British male tennis players
Tennis people from Devon